Geronimo's Last Raid is a 1912 American silent Western film directed by Gilbert P. Hamilton.

Plot
Set around the capture and escape of Geronimo, a prominent Native American leader of the Chiricahua Apache, the film is a period drama involving a love affair between Lieutenant Parker and Pauline, Major Wilkins’ daughter, and the jealous Captain Gray. Gray secretly releases Geronimo held prisoner at Fort Sill and Parker is dispatched to find Geromino. After succeeding in throwing the blame on Parker, Gray receives orders from Major Wilkins to take both Parker and Geronimo prisoners. Pauline learns of the ruse, however, and while attempting to warn Parker, is captured by Geronimo who also takes Parker prisoner. Parker and Pauline manage to escape. Subduing Captain Gray and his men, Geronimo prepares to execute them. Rescued by Lieutenant Parker, Gray nonetheless has him jailed to face a court-martial but Pauline finally clears Parker of the charges against him.

Cast
 J. Warren Kerrigan
 Pauline Bush
 Jack Richardson
 Jessalyn Van Trump
 Jack Nelson as James
 Mabel Emerson as Pauline

External links
 

1912 films
1912 Western (genre) films
1912 short films
American silent short films
American black-and-white films
Silent American Western (genre) films
Films directed by Gilbert P. Hamilton
1910s American films
1910s English-language films